Filippo Cansacchi or Filippo Consacchi (died 1645) was a Roman Catholic prelate who served as Bishop of Gravina di Puglia (1637–1645).

Biography
On 15 December 1636, Filippo Cansacchi was appointed during the papacy of Pope Urban VIII as Bishop of Gravina di Puglia. On 1 January 1637, he was consecrated bishop by Giulio Cesare Sacchetti, Cardinal-Priest of Santa Susanna, with Alexandre della Stufa, Bishop of Montepulciano, and Emilio Bonaventura Altieri, Bishop of Camerino, serving as co-consecrators. He served as Bishop of Gravina di Puglia until his death in 1645.

While bishop, he was the principal co-consecrator of Gaudius Castelli, Bishop of Montepeloso (1637) and Paolo Pellegrini, Bishop of Capri (1641).

See also 
Catholic Church in Italy

References

External links and additional sources
 (for Chronology of Bishops) 
 (for Chronology of Bishops) 

17th-century Italian Roman Catholic bishops
1645 deaths
Bishops appointed by Pope Urban VIII